Sluman is a surname. Notable people with the surname include: 

Jeff Sluman (born 1957), American golfer
Ken Sluman (1924–1991), Canadian football player
Lloyd Sluman (born 1952), English cricketer

See also
Luman (name)
Sloman